Alasmidonta robusta, the Carolina elktoe, was a species of freshwater mussel, an aquatic bivalve mollusk in the family Unionidae, the river mussels.

Distribution
This species was endemic to North Carolina, and was known only from its type specimen collected in Montgomery County, North Carolina. No specimens have been found since, and are presumed extinct.

References

robusta
Molluscs described in 1981
Taxonomy articles created by Polbot